Amayakuralu is a 1971 Indian Telugu-language drama film, produced by D. Madhusudhana Rao under Annapurna Pictures and directed by V. Madhusudhana Rao. It stars Akkineni Nageswara Rao, Kanchana and Sharada, with music composed by S. Rajeswara Rao. The film won the Nandi Award for Third Best Feature Film.

Plot 
The film begins with Shekar (Akkineni Nageswara Rao) and his wife Shobha (Kanchana) planning to marry their daughter Jyothi (Padmini) with her love interest Bhaskar (Chandra Mohan). During the time of engagement, Bhaskar's mother (Radha Kumari) finds out that Jyothi is not their own and also accuses her original mother as a slut when Shekar revolts and starts narrating the past. Shekar has been brought up by his maternal uncle Bhushaiah (Gummadi) along with his cousin Radha (Sarada). Bhushaiah wants to marry them, but his shrewish wife Kanthamma (Suryakantham) opposes it as Shekar is needy. Thereafter, Shekar gets an appointment in a factory owned by a millionaire Ananda Rao (Nagabhushanam) and his daughter Shobha loves him. Meanwhile, Bhushaiah seeks a rich alliance for Radha with a guy Mohan (Ramana Murthy), circumstances make them come closer before marriage and Radha becomes pregnant. During that time, Bhushaiah becomes bankrupt, so Mohan deceives Radha and leaves for abroad. At that moment, Shekar arrives, to protect Radha's honor, he decides to marry her and informs Shobha. Soon, she reaches the venue and questions Shekar about the reason behind his betrayal. Radha overhears the conversation and leaves the house, requesting Shekar to marry Shobha when Bhushaiah dies of a heart attack. After that, Shekar and Shobha get married and start living happily.

Eventually, Radha is safeguarded by a truck driver Ranganna (Bhanu Prakash), who gives birth to a baby girl. Later Ranganna joins Ananda Rao, and through him, Shekar knows the whereabouts of Radha, when he reaches there, Radha slays a goon who tried to molest her and is sentenced to 5 years. Now Shekar takes the baby to his house without revealing her identity and the couple rears the baby as their own by the name Jyothi. Years roll by, and Radha realizes when the truth comes forward, which leads to misunderstandings and disputes between Shekar and Shobha, even Ananda Rao denounces Shekar. At the same time, Mohan returns, unexpectedly, he is the son of Ananda Rao's friend Chakradharam (Venkateswara Rao), who listens to their quarrel and plots to get rid of Shekar to possess Shobha and her property. So, he poses as a reformed person and shows his contrition to Radha, requests to marry, takes her out, and tries to slaughter her. Learning of it, Shekar, along with Ananda Rao and Shobha rush, where they spot the wickedness of Mohan, so, they get him arrested, when Radha dies announcing the virtue of Shekar. At present, the groom's parents realize their mistake and believe in Radha's chastity. Surprisingly, Mohan also comes out who is currently working as the groom's driver and admits his guilt. Finally, the movie ends on a happy note with the marriage of Bhakar and Jyothi.

Cast 

Akkineni Nageswara Rao as Shekar
Kanchana as Shobha
Sharada as Radha
Gummadi as Bhusaiah
Nagabhushanam as Ananda Rao
Allu Ramalingaiah as Hari Govindam
Chalam as Ramudu
Raja Babu as Kotigadu
Chandra Mohan as Bhaskar
Ramana Murthy as Mohan
Venkateswara Rao as Chakradharam
Raavi Kondala Rao as Avadanlu
Bhanu Prakash as Ranganna
Mada as Bhaja Govindam
Suryakantam as  Kantham
Rama Prabha as Lakshmi
Radha Kumari as Bhaskar's mother
Padmini as Jyothi
Baby Dolly as Young Jyothi

Soundtrack 

Music composed by S. Rajeswara Rao.

Awards
The film won Nandi Award for Third Best Feature Film - Bronze - D. Madhusudhana Rao (1971)

References

External links 
 

1970s Telugu-language films
1971 drama films
Films directed by V. Madhusudhana Rao
Films scored by S. Rajeswara Rao
Indian drama films